Cheng Wenshan (11 October 1929 – 9 July 2008) was a Chinese educator who served as president of Hunan University between 1982 and 1987.

Biography
Cheng was born into a family of farming background in Datunying of Ningxiang County, Hunan, on October 11, 1929. After high school, he studied, then taught, at what is now Wuhan University. He also studied at Beijing Russian Studies College. In May 1960 he earned his doctor's degree from Saint-Petersburg State University of Architecture and Civil Engineering.

He joined the Communist Party of China in June 1952.

He joined the Department of Civil Engineering faculty of Hunan University in May 1960 and was promoted to professor in 1983. In March 1981 he was appointed vice-president of Hunan University. After this office was terminated in February 1982, he became president of Hunan University, serving until August 1987.

In 2006, he received his Honorary Doctoral Degree from Chiba University.

On July 9, 2008, he died of illness in Changsha, Hunan.

References

External links

1929 births
People from Ningxiang
2008 deaths
Wuhan University alumni
Saint Petersburg State University alumni
Academic staff of Hunan University
Presidents of Hunan University
Saint-Petersburg State University of Architecture and Civil Engineering alumni